Shanghai French School is a private, international school in Shanghai, China, with one campus in the Qingpu District and one campus in Yangpu District.

Students range from 3 to 18 years of age and must be of French nationality or already have been taught under the French system. It forms part of the international network of French schools managed by the French government through the Agency for French Education Abroad (AEFE), a national administrative body.

History
In 2005, LFS and the German School Shanghai completed a combined "EuroCampus" for their students in Qingpu, Shanghai. 

In 2008, LFS opened a new satellite school in Pudong, Shanghai. The school was opened as a primary school and will grow into secondary school year by year (completion of middle school, collège, by 2012).  As of the 2010-2011 school year, the Pudong campus has students from preschool to troisième (ninth grade).  All students in the secondary school in Pudong follow the English/French bilingual curriculum.

Circa 2013, there was an atmosphere of paranoia among teachers after two American teachers were accused of assaulting minors, with one deported to the United States and pleading guilty to federal offenses there with imprisonment resulting, and the other convicted in Chinese courts and appealing his conviction there; in the atmosphere male teachers were worried of being accused, with some resigning their positions.  the American jailed in China still states he is innocent, and U.S. authorities did not attempt to prosecute him there.

In 2019, LFS opened a new satellite school in Yangpu, Shanghai.

The LFS currently comprises 1600 students.

Campuses

Qingpu campus 
Shanghai French School shares its facilities with Shanghai German School "Deutsche Schule Shanghai" to create the Eurocampus.

Yangpu campus 
With a total area of 56,000 square meters shared with the DSS, the German School in Shanghai, the Eurocampus II Yangpu will be certified LEED Platinum, the highest international certification of eco-buildings, at the completion time of the project. It will be the first school in Asia to obtain this certification. The Eurocampus is composed of 19,000 m² of green space, a 1,200 m² canteen, and exceptional sports facilities ready for use in November: a 7,000 m² sports center, 4 basketball courts, a football pitch and a running track of 400 m. There will also be a 25m swimming pool and a 550-seat theater that will both open at the end of 2020.

Pudong campus (closed) 
The school previously had a campus in Pudong District. The Pudong Campus was on the property of the Shanghai Gold Apple Bilingual School.

Curriculum 

The education offered is equivalent to the education in France, and students sit the French Baccalaureate (Baccalauréat) at the end of Terminale (high school). Beginning in the 2010-2011 school year, students who have followed the appropriate course will have the opportunity to take the OIB (Option Internationale du Baccalauréat) in either Chinese or English.  Preparation for this option requires study of certain subjects in the chosen foreign language.  Alternatively, students may choose to enter the European section which includes extra study of English and a history and geography course taught in English.
  
In 2008, LFS opened two bilingual sections in the primary and middle schools at the QingPu campus.  Parents can choose from dual-language English and French, French and Chinese, or the classic French program.  Students in the bilingual sections are taught on a split timetable with half of their lessons in French and the other half in English or Chinese.

Exams Offered 

In addition to the standard French examinations, LFS offers its students the opportunity to prepare for a variety of Chinese, English, Spanish and German certifications, including:

Cambridge Young Learners' English Tests for primary school students
IGCSE - From troisième (9th grade), advanced English students have the option to prepare for the IGCSE in either English Literature and Language or English as a Second Language.
IELTS - Preparation classes are offered to final year students planning to apply to Anglophone universities.
HSK - The Hànyǔ Shuǐpíng Kǎoshì (HSK), (Chinese: 汉语水平考试), translated as Chinese Standard Exam, is China's only standardized test of Standard Chinese language proficiency for non-native speakers such as foreign students and overseas Chinese. The test is administered by Hanban, a non-government organization affiliated with the Ministry of Education of the People's Republic of China. And the French School of Shanghai is a Hanban centre.

References

External links 

 Lycée Français de Shanghai
 Lycée Français de Shanghai

See also 
 Other French international schools in the PRC
 Lycée Français International de Pékin (Beijing)
 École Française Internationale de Canton (Guangzhou)
 French International School of Hong Kong
 Shekou International School French section

AEFE contracted schools
International schools in Shanghai
Bilingual schools
Shanghai
Schools in Pudong